Score to a New Beginning is the third studio album by the Symphonic power metal band Fairyland. It has been released by Napalm Records.

Track listing
All songs written and composed by Philippe Giordana
 "Opening Credits" – 1:28
 "Across the Endless Sea Part II" – 5:17
 "Assault on the Shore" – 5:08
 "Master of the Waves" – 6:08
 "A Soldier's Letter" – 5:33
 "Godsent" – 4:54
 "At the Gates of Morken" – 4:53
 "Rise of the Giants" – 4:19
 "Score to a New Beginning" – 9:03
 "End Credits" – 3:29
 "A Soldier's Letter (Edit)" (Japanese & Korean bonus track) – 5:31

Personnel
Philippe Giordana – keyboards, acoustic guitars, compositions, concept, programming
Gonzalo Ordóñez Arias – Album art

Guest musicians

Marco Sandron (Pathosray): Lead Vocals
Georg Neuhauser (Serenity): Add. Vocals on tracks 2, 3, 5, 9, 10
Flora Spinelli (Kerion): Lead Vocals on track 10
Klaaire (Syrayde): Add. Vocals on tracks 4, 5, 9
Geraldine Gadaut (Benighted Soul): Add. Vocals on track 7
Jean-Gabriel Bocciarelli (Benighted Soul): Add. Vocals on track 7
Fabio D'Amore (Pathosray, Serenity): Bass, Add. Vocals, Guitar Solo on track 6
Willdric Lievin (Hamka): Drums, Choirs
Chris Menta (Razordog): Rhythmic and Acc. Guitars, Guitar Solos on track 5
Alessio Velliscig (Pathosray): Guitar Solo on track 2
Alex Corona (Revolutions): Guitar Solos on tracks 3, 6, 9
Olivier Lapauze (Heavenly): Guitar Solo on track 9
Hugo Lefebvre (Anthropia): Guitar Solo on track 4
Yann Mouhad (Anthropia): Guitar Solo on track 4
Remy Carrayrou (Kerion): Guitar Solo on track 7
Dushan Petrossi (Iron Mask, Magic Kingdom) – Guitar Solos
Marc Rhulmann (Whyzdom): Keyboard Solo on track 9

External links 

 Fairyland at Napalm Records
 Original Cover Design from artist's webpage

2009 albums
Napalm Records albums
Concept albums
Fairyland (band) albums